The Tower Building is a commercial eighteen-story skyscraper at 323 Center Street in downtown Little Rock, Arkansas.  Built in 1959–60, it was the tallest building in the state at the time of its completion, and the state's first instance of composite steel frame construction.  It was designed by Little Rock architect F. Eugene Withrow and Dallas, Texas architect Harold A. Berry in the International style.  It has curtain walls of windows on its north and south facades, and blank brick walls on the east and west, with the elevator tower projecting from its southern facade.

The building was listed on the National Register of Historic Places in 2011.

See also
National Register of Historic Places listings in Little Rock, Arkansas

References

Commercial buildings on the National Register of Historic Places in Arkansas
Skyscraper office buildings in Little Rock, Arkansas
National Register of Historic Places in Little Rock, Arkansas
Office buildings completed in 1960